John Lester Moss (May 14, 1925 – August 29, 2012) was an American professional baseball player, coach, scout and manager. He played in Major League Baseball as a catcher for the St. Louis Browns for the most significant portion of his career, and was a backup catcher almost all his career.

Baseball career
In  he moved up to the Class A Elmira Pioneers of the Eastern League where he posted a .308 batting average in 96 games.

Moss platooned alongside left-handed-hitting catcher Jake Early, producing a .157 batting average in 96 games during the 1947 season. He caught the majority of the games for the Browns in 1948 while his hitting improved substantially, with a .257 average along with 14 home runs and 46 runs batted in. In 1949, the Browns acquired 24-year-old Sherm Lollar from the New York Yankees and Moss became the second-string catcher. Moss' hitting continued to improve with a .291 average and an impressive .399 on-base percentage.

On May 17, 1951, Moss was traded to the Boston Red Sox. After producing a .198 batting average in 71 games for the Red Sox, he was shipped back to the Browns on November 28, 1951. He continued as the Browns' second string catcher backing up Clint Courtney. Moss was the Browns' catcher on May 6, 1953 when Bobo Holloman pitched a no-hitter against the Philadelphia Athletics. In 1954, the Browns relocated to Baltimore and were renamed the Orioles. Moss played one full season in Baltimore before being traded to the Chicago White Sox on June 6, 1955, where he once again served as a backup to Sherm Lollar. He played three more seasons with the White Sox before ending his major league career after the 1958 season. He would remain a member of the White Sox organization for the next dozen years.

Career statistics
In a 13-year major league career, Moss played in 824 games, accumulating 552 hits in 2,234 at bats for a .247 career batting average along with 63 home runs, 276 runs batted in and a .333 on-base percentage. He ended his career with a .978 fielding percentage.

Coaching and managing career
After his playing career, Moss served as the White Sox' batting practice catcher, then moved into their player development organization as a manager in their farm system and an occasional scout through 1966. In , he managed the Lynchburg White Sox to a second-place finish, and was named the Sally League manager of the year. In  he returned to Indianapolis and managed the Triple-A Indians to a second-place finish. He was a coach on the White Sox' MLB staff from 1967 to 1970. Moss served as interim manager in 1968 for 36 games when White Sox manager Al López had to undergo an emergency appendectomy. He was the White Sox pitching coach in 1970.

From  through , Moss managed high-level teams in the California Angels' system, at Shreveport of the Texas League and Salt Lake City of the Pacific Coast League. There he was credited with developing Lance Parrish's catching skills, after the Tigers converted him from a third baseman. After the 1978 season, Moss was voted Manager of the Year in the American Association, and The Sporting News named him Minor League Manager of the Year.

Moss succeeded Ralph Houk as manager for the 1979 Detroit Tigers. In his time with the Tigers he went 27–26. He actually was not fired for cause or because he was ineffective, but rather because Sparky Anderson had unexpectedly become available. Moss was named manager soon after the 1978 season concluded. However, the Tigers had not counted on Anderson being fired on November 27, 1978 by the Cincinnati Reds. Moss was a victim of bad timing, as the Tigers came to a deal to bring Anderson to the Tigers after the first third of the 1979 season. Dick Tracewski coached four games as interim manager until Anderson's arrival.

Moss finished with a managing record of 39–50 (.438) in 89 games. Moss became a minor-league pitching instructor in the Chicago Cubs' system in 1980, then served as pitching coach of the MLB Cubs in 1981 and Houston Astros from 1983 to 1989, helping the Astros win the 1986 National League Western Division title. Mike Scott won the 1986 National League Cy Young Award while Moss served as the Astros' pitching coach.

Moss died in Longwood, Florida on August 29,  at the age of 87.

Managerial record

References

External links

, or Retrosheet, or SABR Biography Project

1925 births
2012 deaths
Americus Pioneers players
Baltimore Orioles players
Baseball players from Oklahoma
Boston Red Sox players
California Angels scouts
Chicago Cubs coaches
Chicago White Sox coaches
Chicago White Sox managers
Chicago White Sox players
Chicago White Sox scouts
Detroit Tigers managers
Elmira Pioneers players
Houston Astros coaches
Indianapolis Indians managers
Indianapolis Indians players
Major League Baseball bullpen coaches
Major League Baseball catchers
Major League Baseball pitching coaches
Rapiños de Occidente players
San Diego Padres (minor league) players
Sportspeople from Tulsa, Oklahoma
St. Louis Browns players
Toledo Mud Hens players